Palyeidodon is an extinct genus of mammal belonging to the family Toxodontidae, from the Miocene of Argentina. It contains the single species Palyeidodon obtusum.

References 

Toxodonts
Miocene mammals of South America
Neogene Argentina